Vasilios Pliatsikas (born 14 April 1988) is a Greek professional footballer who plays as a centre-back.

Club career

AEK Athens
Pliatsikas began his AEK career in 2005, making his way up from the reserve team, he ended up making 37 league appearances for AEK.

Schalke
On 30 June 2009, Pliatsikas signed a four-year contract with German club Schalke 04 for an undisclosed fee. The beginning of 2010 was not good as Pliatsikas tore his knee ligaments during a training session. This was a major blow as he was beginning to get consistent game time with his club and was in the reckoning for a starting place with his national team. He missed the rest of Schalke's season and also the FIFA World Cup with Greece.
After a very difficult year for the defender marred by injury (149 days to be exact), Pliatsikas returned to action.

Loan to Duisburg
On 1 June 2011, it was announced that Pliatsikas will be loaned to MSV Duisburg for the upcoming season. In 2010–11, he could play only one match for Schalke because of his injury problems and so he should gain playing experiences in the 2. Bundesliga. In 2011, he agreed to be loaned from Schalke for a year to the second division MSV Duisburg. "I wanted to play. After the long period of injury, the season in Duisburg was a very good opportunity to stabilize and find myself playfully." Pliatsikas, was meanwhile converted by MSV coach Oliver Reck to a left-wing defender.

He made his debut in the opening game against Karlsruhe on 17 August, being in the starting line-up in Duisburg's 2–3 defeat. After several fouls, he was forced to leave the field with a yellow-red card in the 76th minute. In his fourth league match for Duisburg against St. Pauli, he was sent off with a yellow-red card again.

Metalurh Donetsk
Pliatsikas participated in the preparation of the club in Turkey, leaving a positive impression and convinced the technical staff to offer him a contract. Pliatsikas, who had become free since last summer from Schalke 04, signed a contract until the end of the season 2013/14 with a renewal option for three more years.

Astra Giurgiu
On 23 July 2014, Pliatsikas signed a 2-year contract with Astra Giurgiu. On 25 July 2014, he made his debut with a club in a 2–0 away win against Concordia Chiajna.

Second spell in Metalurh Donetsk
At the end of 2014 he returned to his former club Metalurh Donetsk. He released his contract at the end of 2014–15 season.

Slovan Bratislava
After six months as a free agent, on 26 January 2016, he signed a six months contract with Slovan Bratislava. He made his debut a month later in a 2–0 away win against AS Trenčín.

Return to Greece
Following a troublesome departure from Slovan, Pliatsikas returned to Greece to play for Panionios, with whom he had been training in the previous 3 months. During this six months he played only one game with the club. On 17 June 2017 Platanias announced the signing of Pliatsikas on a two-year contract. On 1 April 2018, due to imminent demotion to Football League experienced defensive midfielder is expected to be released from struggling Platanias, even before the end of 2017–18 Super League.
On 4 June 2018, Lamia officially announced the signing of experienced right defender / defensive midfielder, until the summer of 2019.

International career

Greece U19
He was part of the Greek squad that reached the final of the 2007 UEFA European Under-19 Football Championship and went on to captain the U19 team the following year which reached the final eight this time round in the 2008 UEFA European Under-19 Football Championship.

Greece
He made his national team debut on 19 November 2008, coming on as an 87th-minute substitute against Italy in a 1–1 draw.

Greece's manager Otto Rehhagel called Pliatsikas for the three 2010 FIFA World Cup qualification matches against Luxembourg, Ukraine and Latvia where he played a pivotal role.

Honours
Astra Giurgiu
Supercupa României: 2014

Schalke 04
 DFB-Pokal: 2010–11

References

External links

 

1988 births
Living people
Greece international footballers
Greece under-21 international footballers
Greek expatriate footballers
Footballers from Athens
Greek footballers
Expatriate footballers in Germany
Expatriate footballers in Ukraine
Expatriate footballers in Romania
Expatriate footballers in Slovakia
Greek expatriate sportspeople in Germany
Greek expatriate sportspeople in Romania
Greek expatriate sportspeople in Ukraine
Greek expatriate sportspeople in Slovakia
Association football defenders
Association football midfielders
AEK Athens F.C. players
FC Schalke 04 players
FC Schalke 04 II players
MSV Duisburg players
FC Metalurh Donetsk players
FC Astra Giurgiu players
PAS Lamia 1964 players
ŠK Slovan Bratislava players
Slovak Super Liga players
Super League Greece players
Bundesliga players
2. Bundesliga players
Ukrainian Premier League players
Liga I players
Chaidari F.C. players